Henry Howard, 7th Duke of Norfolk,  (11 January 1655 – 2 April 1701) was an English nobleman, politician, and soldier. He was the son of Henry Howard, 6th Duke of Norfolk, and Lady Anne Somerset, daughter of Edward Somerset, 2nd Marquess of Worcester, and Elizabeth Dormer. He was summoned to the House of Lords in his own right as Baron Mowbray in 1678. His unhappy marriage was a subject of much gossip, and ended in divorce.

Marriage, separation and divorce

He married Mary Mordaunt, the only surviving daughter and heiress of the 2nd Earl of Peterborough and Penelope O'Brien. They separated in 1685. He divorced her for her adultery with Sir John Germain in  1700, after a previous attempt at divorce in 1692 had failed when the  House of Lords threw out his private  Divorce Bill. Although he succeeded in obtaining damages in an action for criminal conversation, the details were so sordid that he may well have regretted the step, especially since the jury reduced his claim for £100,000 damages to £66, for which they were severely reprimanded by the presiding judge. The Duke was evidently in no position to condemn his wife's moral conduct: even his own counsel called it frankly a case of the pot calling the kettle black.

He died without children, and was succeeded by his nephew, Thomas Howard, 8th Duke of Norfolk. His former wife married secondly Sir John Germain, 1st Baronet, who had been her lover for many years. She died in 1705.

He was rarely on good terms with his father, particularly after 1677 when his father married Jane Bickerton, his mistress of many years standing, an act which caused a violent family quarrel.

Later life

Like almost all the Howards of Norfolk he was a devout Roman Catholic; but during the anti-Catholic hysteria engendered by the Popish Plot he publicly conformed to the Church of England. There is little doubt that this was simply a device to save the family estates. The ploy seems to have succeeded; although his father was charged with recusancy in 1680, the charge was quickly dropped. While the senior Howard line survived unscathed, their cousin William Howard, 1st Viscount Stafford, was executed for his supposed part in the Plot in December 1680. Henry as a peer in his own right, Baron Mowbray, sat as one of the peers who tried him. It is a sign of his moral courage and independent judgment, given the anti-Catholic feeling in the country, that he voted Not Guilty. This was the more notable since according to John Evelyn, of Stafford's extended family in the House of Lords, (eight of them in all), he was the only one to do so, Stafford being a man "not beloved by his family".

He became a Fellow of the Royal Society in 1672. His father was already a fellow and was a generous benefactor of Society.

On 20 June 1685, he was appointed Colonel of the Suffolk Regiment, which at the time was called the Duke of Norfolk's Regiment of Foot. He was created a Knight of the Garter in the same year. As a man "all-powerful in his Dukedom" he used his influence in the 1685 General Election to return members entirely loyal to the Crown (as his father had in 1673 when he found a safe seat at Castle Rising for Samuel Pepys). By 1688, however, he was on bad terms with James II, openly disapproving of the King's aggressive policy of  Catholic championship. When asked to question his constituents on whether they favoured repeal of the Test Act, he replied bluntly that he knew that all those in favour of repeal would fit comfortably in one coach. When asked to replace the magistrates in his dukedom with more compliant ones he simply refused and prudently went to France, but returned in time to welcome the Glorious Revolution.

He served as a Privy Councillor under William III and Mary II in 1689. At first, he refused to take the oath necessary to sit in the House of Lords, since although he had publicly conformed to the Anglican rite, it was no secret that he remained a Roman Catholic at heart; but after a few months, he subscribed to the oath. He continued to serve as Lord Lieutenant of Berkshire, Norfolk and Surrey, and ex-officio colonel of the Berkshire Militia under William and Mary.

The first HMS Norfolk was named after him.

His private surgeon was Thomas Greenhill.

Death

A written account of the death of the 7th Duke of Norfolk, who died in London on Wednesday (O.S.) 2 April 1701 by his secretary Francis Negus.

Family

Ancestry

Family tree

References

See also
 
List of deserters from James II to William of Orange

|-

|-

1655 births
1701 deaths
16th-century English nobility
17th-century English nobility
Cheshire Regiment officers
307
25
306
5th Earl of Norfolk
Earls of Norwich
Barons Mowbray
22
15
Earls Marshal
Henry Howard, 07th Duke of Norfolk
Garter Knights appointed by James II
Lord-Lieutenants of Berkshire
Lord-Lieutenants of Norfolk
Lord-Lieutenants of Surrey
Royal Berkshire Militia officers
Members of the Privy Council of England
Suffolk Regiment officers
Fellows of the Royal Society
Barons Talbot
Barons Strange of Blackmere